The golf competition at the 2014 Central American and Caribbean Games was held in Veracruz, Mexico. The tournament was held from 26–29 November at the Punta Tiburon Residencial Marina and Golf.

Medal summary

Medal table

References

External links
Official Website

2014 Central American and Caribbean Games events
Central American and Caribbean Games
2014
Central American and Caribbean Games